Stevan Kovačević (born 9 January 1988 in Kragujevac, Socialist Federal Republic of Yugoslavia) is a Serbian professional footballer who plays as a midfielder.

References

External links
 Stats at Utakmica 
 
 

1988 births
Living people
Sportspeople from Kragujevac
Serbian footballers
Association football midfielders
Serbian SuperLiga players
FK Radnički Obrenovac players
FK Smederevo players
FK Inđija players
FK Sutjeska Nikšić players
Primeira Liga players
Liga Portugal 2 players
Associação Naval 1º de Maio players
S.C. Covilhã players
F.C. Arouca players
Serbian expatriate footballers
Expatriate footballers in Portugal
Serbian expatriate sportspeople in Portugal